The Basin is a popular swimming location on Rottnest Island, Western Australia.

According to the website of Tourism Western Australia, it has been awarded "Australia's Top Beach". John T. McMahon once wrote of it:

References

Rottnest Island
Beaches of Western Australia